Mayapán Municipality (In the Yucatec Maya Language: “flag of the Mayas") is one of the 106 municipalities in the Mexican state of Yucatán containing (103.47 km2) of land and is roughly 95 km southeast of the city of Mérida.

History
The area that is now the Mayapán Municipality was previously part of the Chumayel Municipality. In 1935, it became the head of its own municipality.

Governance
The municipal president is elected for a three-year term. The town council has four councilpersons, who serve as Secretary and councilors of health, public works, parks and gardens and public monuments.

The Municipal Council administers the business of the municipality. It is responsible for budgeting and expenditures and producing all required reports for all branches of the municipal administration. Annually it determines educational standards for schools.

The Police Commissioners ensure public order and safety. They are tasked with enforcing regulations, distributing materials and administering rulings of general compliance issued by the council.

Communities
The head of the municipality is Mayapán, Yucatán.  Besides the seat, the populated areas of the municipality include:  Chacchibilá, Cumax, Cuzamá, Ibachil, San Antonio, San Antonio Techó, San Ignacio, San Juan, San Juan Uc, San Pedro, San Simón, Santa Isabel, Santa María González, Shichechén, Xcotzá and Yaxbacaltún. The significant populations are shown below:

Local festivals
Every year on 18 March a celebration is held in honor of the Holy Christ of Love.

References

Municipalities of Yucatán